Galeone is an Italian surname. Notable people with the surname include:

Assunta Galeone (born 1998), Italian judoka
Giovanni Galeone (born 1941), Italian footballer and manager
Victor Galeone (born 1935), American Roman Catholic bishop

Italian-language surnames